Cotoneaster conspicuus (Tibetan cotoneaster, 大果栒子 da guo xun zi) is a slow-growing, densely-branched, evergreen shrub native to southeast Tibet. It grows to 1 to 1.5 meters in height, with white five-stellate flowers followed by scarlet fruit, 8–10 mm in diameter.

The cultivar 'Decorus'  has gained the Royal Horticultural Society's Award of Garden Merit.

Synonyms
 Cotoneaster conspicuus (Messel) Messel
 Cotoneaster conspicuus var. decorus P.G.Russell
 Cotoneaster microphyllus var. conspicuus Messel

References

 Holotype: Russell, P. G. 1938. Proc. Biol. Soc. Wash. 51: 184.
 Hortipedia entry

conspicuus